"Project Immortality" is an American television play broadcast on June 11, 1959 as part of the CBS television series, Playhouse 90.  The cast includes Lee J. Cobb and Michael Landon.

Plot
A brilliant man, Professor Lawrence Doner, is dying of leukemia. He is offered an opportunity for immortality by having his brain pattern used as the model for a computer program.

Cast
The cast includes the following:

 Lee J. Cobb … Lawrence Doner
 Kenneth Haigh … Martin Schramm
 Gusti Huber … Eva Doner
 Michael Landon … Arthur Doner
 Patty McCormack … Ketti Doner
 Paul Fix … General
 Richard Carlyle … Schoonover
 Frank Ferguson … DeKlasch
 Barney Phillips … Colonel Bender
 Don Keefer … Leech
 Frederick Worlock … Dr. Samman
 Joseph Sargent … Liggett
 Sheridan Comerate … Driver
 Azaria Port … Agassiz
 Donald Foster … Laniel
 William Boyett … Weiner

Production
The program aired on June 11, 1959, on the CBS television series Playhouse 90. Loring Mandel was the writer and Fielder Cook the director.

References

1959 American television episodes
Playhouse 90 (season 3) episodes
1959 television plays